Francis Herbert Brownell (April 21, 1867 – March 8, 1954) was a Washington state pioneer, lawyer, and businessman. During his lifetime, he worked in and made contributions to the cities of Tacoma, Everett, Seattle, and New York. As an active pioneer and developer of Everett, he was a member of the hospital board, trustee of the city library, director of the First National Bank, and president of the Chamber of Commerce.

Brownell's law career started in New York in 1890. The following year he came to Washington state, at the time of its foundation, searching for better business opportunities. He worked in partnership with other lawyers, his specialty being commercial and corporate law. Among his clients were some of the biggest mining, railroading, and banking companies of that time. 

In later years, Brownell worked for the Guggenheim family for their American Smelting & Refining Company and at the Seattle National Bank. His partnership with the Guggenheims lasted a long time, and Brownell occupied managerial positions in their company from 1909 until his retirement from business in 1950. Brownell became a director of the board of the Seattle National Bank in 1925, and later worked there as a chairman of the board of directors. He was "the second largest individual stockholder" of the bank, and in 1929, as its leader, witnessed the bank's merger into Seattle First National Bank.

Brownell invested heavily in real estate, logging, and lumber companies of Seattle and Everett. He had a vast array of other managerial positions in law, banking, copper, brass, railroad, and other businesses. He led an active social life, being a part of well-known organizations and fraternities. Politically, he was a Republican. With his wife, he attended the Episcopalian church.

Early life and family

Francis Brownell was born on April 21, 1867, in Little Compton, Rhode Island. Brownell's ancestors emigrated from England to America in 1636, settling in Massachusetts. His great-grandfather was a soldier during the Revolutionary War of 1775–1783, and his grandfather was a member of the Rhode Island legislature. Brownell's father, Frederick, was born on Rhode Island, and was a town clerk and treasurer, and also a member of the state legislature. He married Ann Coggshall, whose ancestor was John Coggeshall, founder of the colony of Rhode Island and Providence Plantations. Frederick and Ann had four children, of which Francis was the eldest.

Education

Brownell studied in public schools, until he won a scholarship to Moses Brown School. He graduated from Moses Brown School in 1884 and proceeded to study at Brown University, working as a tutor to pay for his education. He received a Bachelor of Arts degree in 1888. Later, he studied at Columbia Law School.

Career

First jobs in New York and Washington state
 
Brownell started his law practice in New York in June 1890.

Brownell decided to go west in the search of better career opportunities soon after the western part of Washington Territory became Washington state. In August 1890, he settled in Tacoma. He resumed his law practice there in partnership with George A. Brown, a lawyer and nominee for the Nevada Supreme Court bench.

Everett, Washington

Brownell and Brown moved their practice to Everett in 1891, soon after the city's foundation. They kept working together until 1895, when Brown left for Nevada. After Brown's departure, Brownell worked alone for several years, until in 1902, he partnered with J. A. Coleman. They opened their own law firm, Brownell & Coleman, and by 1903 had gained a "distinctively representative clientage."

Brownell largely worked in the field of commercial and corporate law. His clients were considered the leading firms in Everett, including the Everett Improvement Company (formerly the Everett Land Company), the Everett Street Railway & Light Company, the Everett Pulp & Paper Company, the Puget Sound Reduction Company, the Monte Cristo Railroad Company, the Everett First National Bank, the American National Bank, the Monte Cristo Mines, and several other mining companies.

The beginning of 1900's in the U.S. politics contained many important political events, including the introduction of the new primary election law in 1908 and the holding of the first primary election. That year, Brownell participated in Judge W. W. Black's election campaign as a specialist who fully analyzed and explained the new law. 

Brownell was a member of the Everett hospital board and a trustee of the city library. He also served as a director in the First National Bank of Everett and president of the Everett Chamber of Commerce.

Jobs in New York and Seattle

American Smelting and Refining Company 

In 1905, Brownell moved to Seattle, where he kept practicing law, and also worked for the Guggenheim family in their smelting and refining business. In 1909, he became president of the Federal Mining and Smelting Company, which had recently been bought by the Guggenheims' American Smelting & Refining Company.

By 1919, Brownell moved to New York, accepting the Guggenheims' invitation to fill the executive position in their American Smelting & Refining Company. By 1925, the company was estimated as "the largest of its kind in the world," and owned and operated smelters in Mexico, South America, and North America.

Brownell started as general counsel to the company. At different times he was the president and the chairman of the company finance committee, the first vice president, the chairman of the company board, and head of the company.

In 1925, Brownell, as the chairman of the company finance committee, played a key role in a corporate dispute between the Guggenheims and Karl Eilers, helping the Guggenheims in defending their rights.

Seattle National Bank

After becoming counsel for the Guggenheims, Brownell lived mostly in New York. However, he still spent much time in Seattle. In 1925, he was elected director of the board of the Seattle National Bank. According to chairman of the board, Daniel Kelleher, Brownell's friend and the "largest individual stockholder" of the bank, Brownell was a "successful business executive" who took an active part in the development of the National Bank and its international affairs. Brownell became "the second largest individual stockholder" of the bank. 

In 1929, Brownell succeeded Daniel Kelleher at the position of the chairman of the board of directors. The same year, under Brownell's leadership the bank merged with the Seattle First National Bank.

Other activity and positions

Besides his main field of work in Everett and Seattle, Brownell invested in real estate in both cities as well as in logging and lumber companies. 

In New York, he was a member of the executive committee and a director of the Chase National Bank, the General Cable Corporation, the Republic Brass Corporation, the Northern Pacific Railway, the Mortgage Bond Company, and the American Sugar & Refining Company; president of the Washington State Bar Association, and board chairman of the Revere Copper & Brass Incorporation.

As the president of the Copper Institute and chairman of the Copper Exporters Incorporation, Brownell was involved in a dispute in regard to the copper price increase in 1929. He was known in business as a "prominent financier and Puget Sound area business leader."

Retirement and later activity

In 1950, Brownell retired from his business activity. After retirement, he published a brochure, called Gold and the Monetary Problem in 1949, disputing the monetary system, prices on gold, and dealings connected to its rise and fall.

Memberships

In college, Brownell was a member of Alpha Delta Phi and Phi Beta Kappa social fraternities. In later life, he belonged to the Masonic Peninsular Lodge No. 95, F. & A. M. of Everett, the Knights of Pythias, the Benevolent and Protective Order of Elks, and was one of the organizers of the Snohomish County Agricultural Society. 

He was a member of the Seattle exclusive social organization the Country Club, the Seattle Golf Club, the Rainier Club, and the Washington State Bar Association.

Personal life, family and death

Brownell married Josephine Noble in 1894; they had two sons, Francis H. Brownell Jr. and Kenneth Cooke Brownell. Both sons followed in their father's footsteps: Francis H. Jr. worked at the Seattle National Bank, occupying the position of a vice president, and Kenneth C. was president and chairman of the American Smelting & Refining Company and subsequently of the Federal Mining and Smelting Company, whose rights belonged to the ASARCo.

In 1902, Brownell built a family home on the southwest corner of 23rd and Rucker streets in Everett. Later, the family lived in New York, and additionally, like every member of the Seattle Country Club, had a residence on Bainbridge Island.

The Brownells attended the Episcopalian church, of which Josephine Brownell was a member. In politics, Brownell supported the Republican party.

Brownell died on March 8, 1954, in his home in New York, after an illness that lasted several months.

See also 

 Columbia Law School
 Washington State Bar Association 
 Guggenheim family
 American Smelting & Refining Company
 Rainier Club

References

Literature cited

External links 
 

People from Little Compton, Rhode Island
Columbia Law School alumni
Brown University alumni
Lawyers from New York City
Washington (state) pioneers
Corporate lawyers
People from Everett, Washington
Businesspeople from Seattle
American bankers
Businesspeople from New York City
Businesspeople in real estate
American mining businesspeople